The 2007 NASCAR Corona Series is the fourth season of NASCAR Mexico's major stock car racing series and the first under the name NASCAR Corona Series.

Drivers

Schedule
The series kicked off at the Autodromo Hermanos Rodriguez in Mexico City, with a non-points-paying race during the weekend of March 4, along with events from the Busch Series and the Rolex Sports Car Series. The race was won by Carlos Pardo (#14 Dodge), followed by Rafael Martínez (#19 Ford) and Freddy Tame, Jr. (#18 Ford).

The schedule will consist of 14 points-paying races after the Mexico City race, 10 of which will be double-feature events with the NASCAR Mexico T4 Series.

Results

1 Qualifying cancelled by rain.
2 Qualifying cancelled by rain.
3 Qualifying cancelled by rain.

See also
2007 NASCAR Nextel Cup Series
2007 NASCAR Busch Series
2007 NASCAR Craftsman Truck Series
2007 NASCAR Busch East Series
2007 NASCAR Canadian Tire Series

References

NASCAR Corona Series season

NASCAR Mexico Series